Cryptanthus acaulis is a plant species in the genus Cryptanthus. This species is endemic to Brazil.

Cultivars
 Cryptanthus 'Bivittato-Acaulis'
 Cryptanthus 'Cabo Frio Cabbage'
 Cryptanthus 'Cochleatus'
 Cryptanthus 'Grace'
 Cryptanthus 'Makoyanus'
 Cryptanthus 'Mary Jo'
 Cryptanthus 'Variegata'
 Cryptanthus 'Whirligig'
 × Neotanthus 'Ted Will'

References

BSI Cultivar Registry Retrieved 11 October 2009

acaulis
Flora of Brazil